There have been many incidents of police violence during the George Floyd protests, an ongoing series of protests and demonstrations against police brutality and racism in policing. The protests began on May 26, 2020, following the murder of George Floyd, a 46-year-old black man, by Derek Chauvin, a  44-year-old white man employed as a Minneapolis police officer, who knelt on Floyd's neck for 9 minutes and 29 seconds during an arrest the previous day.

Lawyer T. Greg Doucette and mathematician Jason Miller compiled a list of videos posted on Twitter showing evidence of alleged police brutality, which as of July 26, 2020 contained more than 830 videos. Investigative journalism website Bellingcat documented over 140 police violence incidents against journalists during the protests. The U.S. Press Freedom Tracker found there were almost as many press freedom violations in one week as for the entire year in 2019.

Definitions
Police have standard procedures for ways to manage protests that may employ legally warranted forms of violence.  In contrast,  police brutality is the excessive and unwarranted use of violent force by law enforcement.  Brutality is an extreme form of police misconduct or violence and is a civil rights violation. Police brutality can include but is not limited to physical or verbal harassment, physical or mental injury, property damage, inaction of police officers, "indiscriminate use of riot control agents at protests", racial abuse, torture, beatings, and death.  Human rights include right to equal protection under the law and the rights to liberty, security, and freedom from discrimination.  This article lists incidents of police violence during George Floyd protests that may or may not have been legally warranted.

List of incidents

See also
 2020 deployment of federal forces in the United States

References

External links
 Online spreadsheet containing Doucette data

police vio
2020 protests
2020 riots
African-American-related controversies
George Floyd protests in the United States
Incidents during the George Floyd protests
police vio
Law enforcement controversies in the United States
police vio
Protests against police brutality
Race-related controversies in the United States
police vio
Police brutality in the United States